Women Are Like That (French: Comment qu'elle est?) is a 1960 French spy thriller film  directed by Bernard Borderie and starring Eddie Constantine, Françoise Brion and Alfred Adam. It is based on the 1945 novel I'll Say She Does by the British writer Peter Cheyney featuring hardboiled FBI agent Lemmy Caution. It was part of a series of films featuring Constantine as Caution, inspired by the books by Cheyney who had a large French following.

The film's sets were designed by the art director René Moulaert.

Synopsis
Federal agent Lemmy Caution arrives in France to hunt down a spy known as Varley, but finds himself in a rivalry with the French police who are also chasing the same lead.

Cast
 Eddie Constantine as Lemmy Caution
 Françoise Brion as Martine
 Alfred Adam as 	Pascal Girotti
 Renaud Mary as Demur
 Robert Berri as Dombie
 Nicolas Vogel as Mayne
 Françoise Prévost as Isabelle
 André Luguet as Le général Rupert
 Fabienne Dali as Danielle
 Jacques Seiler as Le commissaire
 Henri Cogan as Zucco
 Billy Kearns as Charlie Ribban
 Darling Légitimus as Palmyre 
 Colin Drake as Général Flash
 Jean Landier as Le barman Vaudois
 Albert Michel as Le brigadier au cabaret
 Georges Demas as Le barman 'Pomme d'amour'
 Marcel Pérès as 	Le premier agent cycliste
 Émile Genevois as 	Le second agent cycliste 
 Henri Lambert as Le portier 'Chat botté'
 Nicole Dore as 	La streap-teaseuse
 Charles Marosi as L'expert-comptable

References

Bibliography 
 Goble, Alan. The Complete Index to Literary Sources in Film. Walter de Gruyter, 1999.
 Rège, Philippe. Encyclopedia of French Film Directors, Volume 1. Scarecrow Press, 2009.

External links 
 
 

1960 films
1960s spy thriller films
French spy thriller films
1960s French-language films
Films directed by Bernard Borderie
Films based on British novels
Films set in France
1960s French films